was a Japanese general, who commanded the 16th Division in the Battle of Leyte.  He killed himself after the battle, with only 620 men of the division surviving.

References

1893 births
1945 deaths
Japanese generals
Imperial Japanese Army personnel of World War II
Japanese military personnel killed in World War II
Japanese military personnel who committed suicide